Stay Gold (March 24, 1994 – February 5, 2015) was a Japanese Thoroughbred racehorse who had his greatest success in international races. He was sired by Sunday Silence and was out of the mare Golden Sash by Dictus. Famously known as a "Silver Collector", running good results but unable to win in major races; he eventually won the Dubai Sheema Classic and Hong Kong Vase towards the end of his career. He is also a successful sire in Japan after his retirement from racing.

Early years 
Stay Gold made his debut at Hanshin Racecourse on December 1, 1996 but it was more than a year before he won for the first time. On September 7, 1997, he won a minor race, the "Lake Akan-ko special()", and then did not win again for more than two years.

Silver collector 
Between 1998 and 2000, Stay Gold ran prominently in many of Japan's top races, including the Diamond Stakes, Tenno Sho (Spring), Takarazuka Kinen, Arima Kinen, and Tenno Sho (Autumn). He collected 9 places and 7 shows, but victory proved elusive.

Although he didn't win any graded races, Stay Gold accumulated significant earnings. His title was "Major Racing Wins: Lake Akan-ko special" all the time, but had many other nicknames. He was called "the successor to Nice Nature,"  a Japanese race horse who won 6 graded races but was better known for his many placed efforts.

The biggest victory 
On May 20, 2000, he was ridden by Yutaka Take and in the Meguro Kinen and obtained victory for the first time in 2 years and 8 months. It was his only win of the year.

In 2001, Stay Gold began with a win in the Grade II Nikkei Shinshun Hai and was then aimed at the Dubai Sheema Classic (UAE-G2:then) at Nad Al Sheba Racecourse. Fantastic Light, winner of the previous year's World Series Racing Championship, was the clear favourite, with Stay Gold a 33-1 shot. Fantastic Light took the lead a furlong out, but Stay Gold rallied to get up on the line and win by a nose. It was the first victory outside Japan for Sunday Silence's progeny.

In October, he took on two of Japan's best thoroughbreds, T M Opera O and Narita Top Road, in the Kyoto Daishoten and defeated them, only to be disqualified for interfering with Narita Top Road.

His last run was Hong Kong Vase at Sha Tin Racecourse, Hong Kong. Stay Gold caught Ekraar in the final strides and won by a head. After the race, Yutaka Take, who rode him, said, "Wings grew on his back." At the end of the season, the Japan Racing Association gave Stay Gold the JRA Special Award for becoming the first overseas G1 race winner bred by Japanese farms.

Although initially unplanned, fan outcry and a request from the JRA after his victory at Hong Kong led to Stay Gold's retirement ceremony being performed at Kyoto Racecourse  on January 20, 2002.

Stay Gold died suddenly on February 5, 2015.

Stud record 
At the end of his racing career, Stay Gold was retired to become a breeding stallion and has proved to be a very successful sire of winners. When he was in Hong Kong, he wore a Zeichen written as "" in the Chinese language. In Japanese, this kanji means "golden journey", a name which perfectly summaries his career. His progeny are sometimes named after words about trips or travel. One of these is Dream Journey, who won the Grade 1 Arima Kinen, Takarazuka Kinen, and Asahi Hai Futurity Stakes.

Major winners

c = colt, f = filly

Pedigree

See also
 List of historical horses

Notes

External links
 Stay Gold wins Dubai Sheema Classic
 Stay Gold wins Hong Kong Vase

1994 racehorse births
2015 racehorse deaths
Racehorses bred in Japan
Racehorses trained in Japan
Thoroughbred family 1-t